The Pee-Wee 3D: The Winter That Changed My Life is a Canadian comedy-drama sports film, directed by Éric Tessier and released in 2012. The film centers on the Lynx, a junior hockey team in Mont-Saint-Hilaire, Quebec who are preparing for their league's top tournament.

The film's cast includes Antoine Olivier Pilon, Rémi Goulet, Alice Morel-Michaud, Julie Le Breton, Guy Nadon and Claude Legault. Morel-Michaud received a Canadian Screen Award nomination for Best Supporting Actress at the 1st Canadian Screen Awards, and Nadon received a Prix Jutra nomination for Best Supporting Actor at the 15th Prix Jutra.

A sequel film, Junior Majeur, was released in 2017.

References

External links

2012 films
Canadian ice hockey films
Canadian comedy-drama films
Canadian children's comedy films
Films directed by Éric Tessier
Films set in Quebec
French-language Canadian films
2010s Canadian films